This is a chronological List of World Super Middleweight Boxing Champions, as recognized by four of the better-known sanctioning organizations:

 The World Boxing Association (WBA), founded in 1921 as the National Boxing Association (NBA),
 The World Boxing Council (WBC), founded in 1963,
 The International Boxing Federation (IBF), founded in 1983,
 The World Boxing Organization (WBO), founded in 1988,

See also
 List of British world boxing champions

External links

Super Middleweight Champions

World boxing champions by weight class